Kelly's Stables may refer to:

 Kelly's Stables (Chicago), an American jazz venue in Chicago
 Kelly's Stables (New York), a jazz club on Manhattan's 52nd Street in New York City